is a Japanese politician, a member of the Initiatives from Osaka party in the House of Representatives in the Diet (national legislature). A native of Hirara, Okinawa and graduate of Chuo Gakuin University, he was elected for the first time in 1996 as a member of the Liberal Democratic Party. He previously joined People's New Party in 2008. Shimoji was Minister of State for Disaster Management for the final 2.5 months of the cabinet of Prime Minister Yoshihiko Noda.

Shimoji has contested Okinawa's 1st district in almost every election since 1996. He was first elected as the district's representative in 2005. He was re-elected in 2009, but lost his seat in the 2012 election. Shimoji recontested the seat in the 2014 election. While unable to win the seat outright, he obtained a seat through his spot in Japan Restoration Party's PR list.

References

External links 
 Official website in Japanese.

Members of the House of Representatives (Japan)
Liberal Democratic Party (Japan) politicians
People's New Party politicians
Living people
1961 births
Nippon Ishin no Kai politicians
21st-century Japanese politicians
Politicians from Okinawa Prefecture